Giovanny Manuel Báez Álvarez (born April 9, 1981 in Nobsa) is a Colombian professional road racing cyclist, who is currently suspended from the sport after a positive drugs test for a Continuous erythropoietin receptor activator (CERA).

Major results

2004
 1st Stage 11 Vuelta a Venezuela
2005
 1st Stage 1 (TTT) Vuelta a León
2009
 1st Stage 11 Vuelta a Colombia
2010
 1st Stage 5 Tour de Santa Catarina
2011
 1st Overall Vuelta a Guatemala
1st Stages 7 & 9
 3rd Overall Vuelta a La Rioja
2012
 3rd Overall Tour of Qinghai Lake

References

External links 

 

1981 births
Living people
People from Nobsa
Colombian male cyclists
Vuelta a Colombia stage winners
Vuelta a Venezuela stage winners
Sportspeople from Boyacá Department
21st-century Colombian people